Aarne Vehkonen (16 July 1927 – 29 March 2011) was a Finnish weightlifter. He competed in the men's bantamweight event at the 1952 Summer Olympics.

References

External links
 

1927 births
2011 deaths
Finnish male weightlifters
Olympic weightlifters of Finland
Weightlifters at the 1952 Summer Olympics
People from Kajaani
Sportspeople from Kainuu